Antonio Gento López (25 October 1940 – 25 December 2020) was a Spanish professional footballer who played as a forward.

Career
Born in Guarnizo, Gento played for Plus Ultra, Real Madrid, Levante, Racing Santander, Real Oviedo and SD Unión Club.

Personal life
His brothers Paco Gento and Julio Gento were also footballers. His nephews were also athletes – José Luis Llorente and Toñín Llorente played basketball, whilst Paco Llorente and Julio Llorente were footballers. Grand-nephew Marcos Llorente, son of Paco Llorente, was also a footballer.

He died on 25 December 2020, aged 80.

References

1940 births
2020 deaths
Spanish footballers
Real Madrid Castilla footballers
Real Madrid CF players
Levante UD footballers
Racing de Santander players
Real Oviedo players
Segunda División players
La Liga players
Association football forwards
Gento family
People from the Bay of Santander
SD Unión Club players